McGhie is a surname. Notable people with the surname include:

Billy McGhie (footballer, born 1958), Scottish professional footballer
Billy McGhie (footballer, born 1961), Scottish professional footballer and manager
Gordon McGhie, Canadian music composer
Gordon McGhie (1907–1975), Australian rugby union player
James McGhie, Lord McGhie (born 1944), Scottish judge
John McGhie (1914–1985), Scottish army psychiatrist
Robert McGhie (born 1951), Australian rules footballer

See also
Chiefs of McGhie, heads of families of Clan McGhie, a lowland branch of Clan Mackay, an ancient Scottish family
Magee (disambiguation)
McGee (disambiguation)
McGhee, a surname